Traci Hale is an Atlanta-based American pop and R&B songwriter and vocalist. She began her career as a backup singer for R&B superstars Keith Sweat and Aaliyah before becoming a songwriter for artists including Rihanna, Blu Cantrell, Mýa and Brandy. Her best-known compositions include "Case of the Ex", as recorded by Mýa, and Rihanna's "What's My Name?", which reached number one on the US Billboard Hot 100.

Career
Traci Hale began her career as a backing singer for R&B stars Keith Sweat and Aaliyah. It was while on tour with Aaliyah in 1996 that she shared songs that she had been writing privately with fellow backing vocalist Nycolia "Tye-V" Turman, who was also a songwriter signed to Zomba Music Publishing. Turman invited Hale to write with her at an upcoming session in Los Angeles. Her first collaborations were with Rodney Jerkins and the two worked on the Dr. Dolittle (soundtrack) and Brandy's breakthrough album Never Say Never.

Traci then went on to write with Chris "Tricky" Stewart of Red Zone Entertainment and together they wrote hits including Sammie's "Crazy Things I Do", Mýa's 2000 breakthrough hit "Case of the Ex (Whatcha Gonna Do)". In 2001 Hale wrote a song for the Chris Rock film Down to Earth and songs on albums for Tyrese (RCA), Ginuwine and Usher.

In 2010 Hale co-wrote the song "What's My Name?" with Ester Dean and Stargate, which became a number-one hit on the Billboard Hot 100 for Rihanna.

References

External links
 Twitter page

Living people
Year of birth missing (living people)